Elections to Craigavon Borough Council were held on 17 May 1989 on the same day as the other Northern Irish local government elections. The election used four district electoral areas to elect a total of 26 councillors.

Election results

Note: "Votes" are the first preference votes.

Districts summary

|- class="unsortable" align="centre"
!rowspan=2 align="left"|Ward
! % 
!Cllrs
! % 
!Cllrs
! %
!Cllrs
! %
!Cllrs
! % 
!Cllrs
! %
!Cllrs
! %
!Cllrs
!rowspan=2|TotalCllrs
|- class="unsortable" align="center"
!colspan=2 bgcolor="" | UUP
!colspan=2 bgcolor="" | SDLP
!colspan=2 bgcolor="" | DUP
!colspan=2 bgcolor="" | Alliance
!colspan=2 bgcolor="" | Sinn Féin
!colspan=2 bgcolor="" | Workers' Party
!colspan=2 bgcolor="white"| Others
|-
|align="left"|Craigavon Central
|bgcolor="40BFF5"|45.0
|bgcolor="40BFF5"|4
|13.2
|1
|17.5
|1
|8.0
|1
|8.1
|0
|4.9
|0
|3.3
|0
|7
|-
|align="left"|Loughside
|14.7
|0
|bgcolor="#99FF66"|54.2
|bgcolor="#99FF66"|3
|0.0
|0
|0.0
|0
|18.9
|1
|12.2
|1
|0.0
|0
|5
|-
|align="left"|Lurgan
|bgcolor="40BFF5"|56.6
|bgcolor="40BFF5"|4
|12.3
|1
|20.1
|2
|6.6
|0
|3.3
|0
|1.1
|0
|0.0
|0
|7
|-
|align="left"|Portadown
|bgcolor="40BFF5"|45.0
|bgcolor="40BFF5"|4
|13.2
|1
|16.0
|2
|7.2
|1
|6.4
|0
|1.4
|0
|10.8
|0
|7
|- class="unsortable" class="sortbottom" style="background:#C9C9C9"
|align="left"| Total
|42.4
|12
|21.0
|6
|14.4
|4
|5.8
|2
|8.4
|1
|4.3
|1
|3.7
|0
|26
|-
|}

District results

Craigavon Central

1985: 3 x UUP, 2 x DUP, 1 x SDLP, 1 x Workers' Party
1989: 4 x UUP, 2 x DUP, 1 x SDLP, 1 x Alliance
1985-1989 Change: UUP and Alliance gain from DUP and Workers' Party

Loughside

1985: 2 x SDLP, 1 x Sinn Féin, 1 x Workers' Party, 1 x UUP
1989: 3 x SDLP, 1 x Sinn Féin, 1 x Workers' Party
1985-1989 Change: SDLP gain from UUP

Lurgan

1985: 4 x UUP, 2 x DUP, 1 x SDLP
1989: 4 x UUP, 2 x DUP, 1 x SDLP
1985-1989 Change: No change

Portadown

1985: 3 x UUP, 2 x DUP, 1 x SDLP, 1 x Sinn Féin
1989: 4 x UUP, 1 x DUP, 1 x SDLP, 1 x Alliance
1985-1989 Change: UUP and Alliance gain from DUP and Sinn Féin

References

Craigavon Borough Council elections
Craigavon